James Gabriel is a Canadian Mohawk politician

James Gabriel may also refer to:

James N. Gabriel (1923–1991), American lawyer and judge
Jimmy Gabriel (1940–2021), Scottish footballer

See also 
James Gabriel Huquier (1725–1805), French painter and engraver
James Gabriel Montresor (1704–1776), British military engineer